Polache (born Paul Hughes Ramos, February 10, 1977 in Tegucigalpa, Honduras) is a Honduran musician and soccer player. He has released four albums in the country and represented Honduras in the 2014 Viña del Mar International Song Festival. Polache cares about being authentic with melodies that reflect the daily life of Honduras. He likes to write about love, peace, war, football, corruption, women and he tries to highlight the Honduran culture in his songs.

He played soccer for Deportes Savio in the Liga Nacional de Ascenso de Honduras and wrote a song dedicated to the team. He also wrote a song for the Honduras national soccer team for the 2014 World Cup.

He was briefly banned in the country following the 2009 Honduran coup d'état for performing with Manuel Zelaya, who was later overthrown.

Personal life
Polache's father is British and his mother is Honduran. "Polache" is the Spanish pronunciation of his name, "Paul H." In 2012, he was deported from the United States because he tried to work with a tourist visa.

References

1977 births
Living people
Honduran musicians
Honduran footballers
Honduran Liga Nacional de Ascenso players
Honduran music
Association footballers not categorized by position